Nashville's Union Station is a former railroad terminal designed by Richard Montfort, chief engineer of the Louisville and Nashville Railroad (L&N), and built between 1898–1900 to serve the passengers of the eight railroads that provided passenger service to Nashville, Tennessee, at the time, but principally the L&N. Built just west of the downtown area, it was spanned by a viaduct adjacent to the station and positioned to the east and above a natural railroad cut, through which most of the tracks in the area were routed. The station was also used by streetcars prior to their discontinuance in Nashville in 1941.

It ceased train operation in 1979, and lay abandoned until opening as a hotel in 1986. Union Station became a Marriott Autograph Collection Hotel in 2012 and completed a full renovation of all guest rooms and public spaces in 2016. It became a member of Historic Hotels of America in 2015.

History
Opened October 9, 1900, as a Louisville & Nashville Railroad station, Union Station had a long history before it shut down in October 1979. When a new post office was built in Nashville in 1935, it was located adjacent to Union Station. A connecting passageway between the two was used to transport mail to and from trains for more than three decades.

The station reached peak usage during World War II when it served as the shipping-out point for tens of thousands of U.S. troops and was the site of a USO canteen. The station's decline started in the 1960s, amid the larger nationwide decline in passenger rail service. By the end of the decade, the L&N was the only railroad using the station. Only six trains per day stopped there, down from 16 in the late 1940s.

The primary passenger trains through Nashville over the years included:

Decline 
Amtrak took over intercity service on May 1, 1971. For much of 1971, Nashville was severed from the national rail network. On November 14, 1971 Amtrak began running a single route through Nashville, the Floridian, successor of the South Wind, with service once in each direction between Chicago and–via a split in Wildwood, Florida–St. Petersburg and Miami. However, the Floridian made its final run on October 9, 1979 after being plagued by rampant delays. The last train to call at Union Station was a southbound Floridian, ending over 120 years of intercity rail service in Nashville. Many of its open spaces were roped off, and its architectural features became largely a habitat for pigeons for several years.

After it closed, the station fell into the custody of the federal government's General Services Administration, which struggled for years to find a viable redevelopment plan as the station continued to decline. Nashville locals continuously rejected plans that did not include retaining the main terminal building.

Redevelopment 
The site remained vacant until 1986 when a group of investors worked together to turn it into a luxury hotel with 125 luxury rooms and 12 suites. The hotel plan was based on the use of "junk bond" financing, and the interest payments were so high the hotel required 90% occupancy at an average room rate of $135 per night to break even. This was not a supportable business model in the 1980s Nashville hotel market, and the project soon went bankrupt, calling the future of the station into question again. However, a new investor group bought the hotel in bankruptcy and was able to operate profitably without charging exorbitant room rates or requiring such a high occupancy rate due to the lower cost basis.

More problematic was the effort to find a modern use for the massive trainshed adjacent to the terminal building. Said to be the largest of its kind in the world at the time and an engineering masterpiece, the structure continued to deteriorate. Several suggested plans, including one to raise it up to street level (from the cut level) and turn it into a farmers' market, never came to fruition. A fire damaged the structure in 1996, and it was eventually demolished in late 2000 after several years of failing to come up with a viable preservation plan.

Since the site's conversion to a hotel in 1986, Union Station has undergone several renovations. The first occurred in 2007 and cost $11 million. An additional $1.9 million of upgrades were made in 2012 when the hotel became a Marriott Autograph Collection hotel. In 2014, Pebblebrook Hotel Trust bought Union Station Hotel for $52.3 million and hired Gobbell Hays Partners, Inc., to design renovations that ultimately cost $15.5 million. Sage Hospitality operates the hotel for Pebblebrook.

Historical landmark 
Along with the adjoining trainshed, Union Station became a National Historic Landmark in 1976. However, its historical landmark status was withdrawn in 2003 due to the fire damage to the trainshed that occurred in 1996 and ultimately led to the demolition of that part of the property. Union Station remains on the National Register of Historic Places (listed in 1969) for its local relevance to the city of Nashville and the state of Tennessee.

Architecture and interior 
The station is an example of late-Victorian Romanesque Revival architecture and has high towers and turrets that are reminiscent of a castle. The tower originally contained an early mechanical digital clock, but it was replaced by a traditional analog clock when replacement French silk drive belts became unavailable during World War I. The original bronze statue of the Roman god Mercury that sat on top of the tower was toppled in a storm in 1951 but was later replaced in the mid-1990s with a two-dimensional form painted in trompe-l'œil style to replicate the original. This second Mercury was destroyed in the 1998 downtown Nashville tornado but was also replaced.

The décor in the hotel includes features like three crystal chandeliers, Italian marble floors, wrought iron accents, oak-accented doors, and three limestone fireplaces, along with a 65-foot, barrel-vaulted, stained glass lobby ceiling. The walls are covered with art, including numerous bas-relief sculptures. The two sculptures known as "Miss Nashville" and "Miss Louisville" are said to be images of two of the builder's daughters. Other bas-reliefs depict various historical modes of transportation. Some of the station's original tile remains in the hotel's bar and restaurant area.

See also
Dixiana (passenger train)
Dixie Flagler
Humming Bird (passenger train)
Pan-American (passenger train)
Tennessean (passenger train)

References

External links

Article from Railway Age (1898) with floor plan

Transportation buildings and structures in Nashville, Tennessee
Nashville
Towers in Tennessee
Railway stations in the United States opened in 1900
Nashville
Railway stations in Tennessee
Railway stations on the National Register of Historic Places in Tennessee
Clock towers in Tennessee
Former National Historic Landmarks of the United States
Nashville
Railway hotels in the United States
Autograph Collection Hotels
National Register of Historic Places in Nashville, Tennessee